The Fraser River flood of 1948 was the most devastating flooding to hit Greater Vancouver in living memory. In that years floods, more than 2,300 homes were destroyed, and 16,00 people displaced, as well as a great number of livestock killed. The population of the Lower Fraser Valley at the time was only around 50,000. At the floods height, the water level measured 7.6m. The areas of Abbotsford and northern Langley were particularly hard-hit. The Canadian National Railway line and the Trans-Canada Highway rail lines were flooded, cutting southwestern B.C. off from the rest of Canada. When the waters receded, 10 were dead, 1,500 were left homeless, and between $150-$210 million in damage had been inflicted on the area

Timeline of Events

May 26th 
District engineer with the Dominion Power and Water Bureau, C.W Webb warned that unless there was a large change in temperature within the next ten days, that floods would consume the Lower Fraser Valley

May 28th 
Residents had begun to worry about the high water levels in late May, and on May 28th the dikes at Agassiz and Nicomen Island broke. The Nicomen Island dike was described as bursting "like an atom bomb". The decision was made to evacuate Barnston Island, which was home to 35 families and over 1,000 livestock. The evacuation barges struggled in the angry river, but the operation was a success, with all but 2 horses making it off the island

May 30th 
On May 30th, the Queensborough dike was handed over to the military, with over 70,000 sandbags already in place

May 31st 
The Matsqui District declares a state of emergency. Parts of Fraser Mills and Colony Farm are flooded

June 3rd 
The Hatzic dike breaks, and floods the area around Lougheed Highway.

June 8th 
The west dike at Colony Farm breaks

June 10th 
The floodwaters peak at 7.6m high

June 11th 
The Cloverdale Athletic Hall holds a fundraiser for the flood relief effort, which was quickly sold out

June 25th 
The floods are declared a national emergency by the federal government

June 26th 
The Fraser River had receded to the 20-foot mark, the edge of the danger zone

References 

1948 in Canada
1948 floods in North America
Floods in Canada
1948 disasters in Canada